The Bakerloo line is a railway line on the London Underground.

Bakerloo may also refer to:
Bakerloo (band), a late 1960s British rock/blues group
Bakerloo Music, a record label owned by Mauro Picotto